The 1896 Cincinnati football team was an American football team that represented the University of Cincinnati as an independent during the 1896 college football season. In their first season under head coach William A. Reynolds, the Bearcats compiled a 4–3–1 record. The team played its home games at Union Ball Park in Cincinnati.

Schedule

References

Cincinnati
Cincinnati Bearcats football seasons
Cincinnati football